A Grand Night for Swinging is an album by American jazz guitarist Mundell Lowe featuring tracks recorded in 1957 for the Riverside label.

Reception

Allmusic awarded the album 4 stars stating "A Grand Night for Swinging will be a real treat for fans unfamiliar with Lowe's earlier work, and a satisfying selection for fans of good jazz guitar".

Track listing
 "It's a Grand Night for Swinging" (Billy Taylor) - 4:22   
 "Blues Before Freud" (Mundell Lowe) - 7:18   
 "Easy to Love" (Cole Porter) - 7:19   
 "It Could Happen to You" (Johnny Burke, Jimmy Van Heusen) - 2:53   
 "Love Me or Leave Me" (Walter Donaldson, Gus Kahn) - 3:35   
 "You Turned the Tables on Me" (Louis Alter, Sidney Mitchell) - 5:37   
 "Crazy Rhythm" (Irving Caesar, Roger Wolfe Kahn, Joseph Meyer) - 6:52  
Recorded at Reeves Sound Studios in New York City on March 7 (tracks 1, 3, 4 & 7) April 10 (tracks 2, 5 & 6), 1957

Personnel 
Mundell Lowe - guitar  
Billy Taylor - piano
Les Grinage - bass
Ed Thigpen - drums
Gene Quill - alto saxophone (tracks 2, 5 & 6)

References 

 

1957 albums
Mundell Lowe albums
Albums produced by Orrin Keepnews
Riverside Records albums